The Brussels premetro- and  tramline 7 connects the stop Vanderkindere in Uccle with the stop Heizel/Heysel in Laeken, where connecting services of tram 51, metro 6, bus 84 and bus 88 depart. The colour of the signage for this line is bright yellow.

Route 
Heysel/Heizel - Centenaire/Eeuwfeest - De wand - Araucaria - Buissonets/Braambosjes - Heembeek - van Praet - Docks Bruxsel - Princesse Elisabeth/Prinses Elizabeth - Demolder - Hôpital Paul Brien/Paul Brien-ziekenhuis - Louis Bertrand - Héliotropes/Heliotropen - Chazal - Léopold III/Leopold III - Meiser - Diamant - Georges Henri - Montgomery - Boileau - Pétillon - Arsenal/Arsenaal - VUB - Etterbeek Gare/Etterbeek station - Roffiaen - Buyl - Cambre-Étoile/Ter Kameren-Ster - Legrand - Longchamp - Gossart - Cavell - Churchill - Vanderkindere

History 
This line was formed on March 14 2011, to replace tram 23 and tram 24. Tram 23 followed the same route, as well as tram 24 between Vanderkindere and Princesse Elisabeth/Prinses Elizabeth, where it deviated towards Schaarbeek railway station, 1 stop further. 
Together with tram lines 3, 4, 8 and 9, it is one of five 'chrono' lines, which means that this line is served by low-floor high-capacity trams with a high frequency. The low line number chosen for the new line shows that it is either a metro line or a chrono line.

Timetabling
During the daytime, a tram passes every 7½ minutes, rising to every 6 minutes during peak hours.

Rolling stock 
The line is fully served by the Brussels low-floor trams (the T3000 and T4000).

See also
List of Brussels tram routes

External links
 STIB/MIVB

 Translated from: nl:Tramlijn 7 (Brussel) 

07
City of Brussels
Etterbeek
Ixelles
Schaerbeek
Uccle
Woluwe-Saint-Lambert
Woluwe-Saint-Pierre